Xavier Dectot, born on  in Pithiviers, is a French museum curator and art historian.

A former curator at the Musée de Cluny, specialising in sculptures and ivories from the Middle Ages, he has been director of the Louvre-Lens from 2011 to 2016 and Keeper of Art and Design at the National Museum of Scotland in Edinburgh from 2016 to 2019. Since 2019, he is the director of the Lusail Museum in Doha, Qatar.

Biography

Education 
He studied in the École des chartes, from which he graduated in 1998 with a thesis titled La Mort en Champagne : étude de l’art funéraire aux XIIe-XIIIe siècles), in the Institut national du patrimoine, where he entered in 1997, but only graduated in 2001 as he interrupted his studies to complete his PhD, at the Casa de Velázquez (from 1998 to 2000) and at the École pratique des hautes études (where he obtained his PhD on medieval funerary art in 2001).

Career 
Professor at the École du Louvre, he started his curatorial career in the Musée de Cluny in 2001, in charge of ivories and sculptures, and extensively published the latter collection in paper and online catalogues.

On , he was appointed as the founding director of the Louvre-Lens museum.

In 2016, he left that position to become Keeper of Art and Design at National Museum of Scotland in Edinburgh.

In 2019, he joined Qatar Museums as director of the Orientalist Museum, since then renamed Lusail Museum.

Works 
 Art ou politique, Arcs, statues et colonnes de Paris (avec Geneviève Bresc-Bautier), Action artistique de la ville de Paris, 1999
 L'Art roman en France, musée du Louvre-Hazan, 2004
 Catalogne romane, sculptures du val de Boí (avec Jordi Camps), RMN-Musée national du Moyen Âge, 2004
 Sculptures des XIe-XIIe siècles, roman et premier art gothique, RMN-Musée national du Moyen Âge, 2005
 Pierres tombales médiévales, sculptures de l'au-delà, Remparts, 2006
 Céramiques hispaniques, XIIe-XVIIIe siècles, RMN-Musée national du Moyen Âge, 2008
 Reflets d'or, d'orient en occident : la céramique lustrée, IXe-XVe siècle, RMN-Musée national du Moyen Âge, 2008
 Les Tombeaux des familles royales de la péninsule ibérique au Moyen Âge, Brepols, 2009
 Paris, Ville rayonnante (avec Meredith Cohen), RMN-Musée national du Moyen Âge, 2010
 Sculptures du XIIIe siècle, collections du musée de Cluny, RMN-Musée national du Moyen Âge, 2010
 D'or et de feu : l'art en Slovaquie à la fin du Moyen Âge (avec Dušan Buran et Jean-Christophe Ton-That), RMN-Musée national du Moyen Âge, 2010
 À la table de l'histoire, recettes revisitées, des banquets antiques à aujourd'hui (with Marion Godfroy), Flammarion, 2011

Notes and references

Annexes

See also 
 Louvre
 Louvre-Lens

1973 births
Living people
People from Loiret
French art historians
French art curators
École Nationale des Chartes alumni